Lambis Serafidis (1929 – 20 August 2003) was a Greek professional footballer who played as a forward and a manager.

Club career
Serafidis played mainly as a left winger and started his football career at a club of his neighborhood, AE Ierapolis. At the age of 17, he moved to AEK Athens, where he played for three season, however he did not manage to participate in an official match. In 1949 he moved to the neighboring Apollon Athens playing for two years. In 1951 he returned to AEK, where he remained for another three seasons until 1954, having 9 appearances and 6 goals in the Athens championship. In 1954 Serafidis rejoined Apollon Athens until 1963, when he retired from the as a footballer.

International career
He played in twelve matches for the Greece national football team from 1950 to 1960. He was also part of Greece's team for their qualification matches for the 1954 FIFA World Cup. He also played with the military team and won the World Military Cup in 1952.

Managerial career
Serafidis was occasionally involved in coaching, taking charge over Egaleo, the club where he took his first football steps. In the first of his two spells at the Athenian team, remaining in his position for the entire season, he won the second division championship of the Southern Group and the promotion to the first division.

Other activities
Between 1961 and about 1965, still being an active footballer although he was a substitute, Serafidis invested in business and enacted with the former entertainment center of Panos Gavalas in the forest of the Kaisariani Shooting Range. He was the one who reformed the appearance of the place and renamed it "Charama", a name where in the following decades it developed into a popular spot on the Athenian music scene and hosted well-known representatives of Greek music.

Personal life
He was the older brother of Stelios, who was also a footballer that played as a goalkeeper and followed him from Apollon on his return to AEK in 1951, but he remained at the club for over 20 years as a football player and then in various coaching positions until the 2010's. Although the two brothers coexisted in national team assignments, they ultimately did not compete at the same time as Stelios, being 6 years younger, was anointed an international once, few months before Lambis retired.

Honours

As a player

Apollon Athens
Athens FCA League: 1958

Greece military
World Military Cup: 1952

As a manager

Egaleo
Beta Ethniki: 1976–77 (South group)

References

External links

1929 births
2003 deaths
Greece international footballers
AEK Athens F.C. players
Apollon Smyrnis F.C. players
Egaleo F.C. managers
Association football forwards
Footballers from Athens
Greek footballers